Clivina ampandrandavae is a species of ground beetle in the subfamily Scaritinae. It was described by Basilewsky in 1973.

References

ampandrandavae
Beetles described in 1973